Carl-Johan Häggman (born 22 February 1963 Helsinki) (also called: Carl Johan Haggman or "Haggis") is a Finnish composer, musician and multi-artist. He has also been working as a journalist for example at YLE (The Finnish Broadcasting Company). He has often worked together with his artist wife, the choreographer and director Marja Merisalo in different productions.

Häggman is specialized in various ethnic percussion and film music compositions. After studying philosophy at Helsinki University he made music trips to Turkey, the Caribbean, South America and Greenland, which resulted in music studies and program series in the Finnish radio. Häggman has been collaborating with numerous dancers, actors and directors in many theaters and institutes in Finland (Finnish National Theatre, Helsinki City Theatre, Q-teatteri, Raatikko, Sibelius Academy etc.) as well as internationally.

His music has been heard in many theater plays as well as dance productions and films. One of the later works include music for two documentary films by film director Lasse Naukkarinen, one about the unique original Karelian village Paanajärvi and the other about the state of Kerala in South India. Häggman has also acted in Finnish TV and feature films as well as touring around Finland with theater plays for both adults and children. He has been working at the YLE (Finnish Broadcasting Corporation) making ethnomusical documentaries and other programs for the radio. He also plays in different world music, jazz and other orchestras as a musician. He has also taken part in many international projects, one of them being the TEV-theater that has toured all around the world. (for example at New York Fringe Festival 2009).

Some film projects and music recordings
 DVD: The Rasmus: Live 2012 / vol 2 (as editor) 2013
 CD: SPC Steelband: Sensitive Saguaro (as musician) 2011
 Documentary film: South-Indian Thali Etelä-Intian Thali, director Lasse Naukkarinen (as composer) 2007 
 Documentary film: Anni from Paanajärvi, Paanajärven Anni, director Lasse Naukkarinen (as composer) 2006
 CD: Don Johnson Big Band: Private Intentions (as percussionist) 2006
 Fiction movie: Pelicanman (Pelikaanimies), director Liisa Helminen (as musician) 2004
 Fiction movie: Umur, director: Kai Lehtinen  (as composer) 2004
 CD: Alhaji Dan with Nakhit Silmillah (as musician) 2002
 CD: Vem ska trösta Knyttet (as musician) 1999
 CD: Kuka lohduttaisi Nyytiä (as musician) 2000
 Fiction movie: Hermit Crab, Erakkorapu, director Kai Lehtinen (as composer) 1999
 CD: Porvookantaatti, City of Porvoo 650-years anniversary cantata, Finland (as musician) 1996
 C-cassette release only: Toni Edelmann: Lauluja Putikosta ja Punkaharjulta (as musician) 1993
 Fiction movie: Sateen Jälkeen, director Kiti Luostarinen  (as musician) 1992 
 Fiction movie: Kuulin äänen, director Kiti Luostarinen ja Toni Edelmann (as musician) 1990
 LP: Ahmatova, music from the TV-feature Kuulin äänen (as musician) 1989

References

External links 

Carl-Johan Häggman at Discogs
Shava finnish bhangra band

1963 births
Living people
Finnish composers
Finnish male composers
Finnish film score composers
Male film score composers
Male musical theatre composers
Swedish-speaking Finns